For the purposes of this  list, an entertainment industry dynasty is defined as a set of at least 3 people with family ties, all of whom have acquired significant fame and success in the entertainment industry. Generally, the test of ‘fame and success’ is whether or not a Wikipedia page has been created for the person.

The list is intended to be international in the sense that it seeks coverage of dynasties from any country’s entertainment industry.

 Robert Alda, Alan Alda, Antony Alda, Beatrice Alda, Elizabeth Alda
 John Aniston,  Nancy Dow,  Jennifer Aniston
 Pedro Armendáriz, Gloria Marín, Pedro Armendáriz, Jr.
 Rafael Bardem, Matilde Muñoz Sampedro, Pilar Bardem, Juan Antonio Bardem, Carlos Bardem, Mónica Bardem, Javier Bardem
 Barrymore family- Lionel Barrymore, Ethel Barrymore, John Barrymore,  Drew Barrymore
 Edgar Bergen, Frances Bergen, Candice Bergen
 Lloyd Bridges, Dorothy Bridges, Jeff Bridges, Beau Bridges, Jordan Bridges
 Carradine family- John Carradine, David Carradine, Keith Carradine, Robert Carradine, Calista Carradine, Ever Carradine, Shelley Plimpton, Martha Plimpton
 Jean-Pierre Cassel, Vincent Cassel, Cécile Cassel, Rockin’ Squat
 Timothée Chalamet, Pauline Chalamet, Amy Lippman, Rodman Flender
 Chaplin family- Charlie Chaplin, Sydney Chaplin, Sydney Chaplin, Geraldine Chaplin, Oona Chaplin
 Coppola family- Francis Ford Coppola, Talia Shire, Sophia Coppola, Nicolas Cage, Jason Schwartzman, Robert Schwartzman
 Timothy Carlton Cumberbatch, Wanda Ventham, Benedict Cumberbatch
 Tony Curtis, Janet Leigh, Jamie Lee Curtis
 Dick Cusack, Joan Cusack, Ann Cusack, John Cusack
 Gérard Depardieu, Élisabeth Depardieu, Guillaume Depardieu, Julie Depardieu
 Johnny Depp, Vanessa Paradis, Lily-Rose Depp
 Kirk Douglas, Michael Douglas, Joel Douglas, Cameron Douglas
 Estevez family- Martin Sheen, Joe Estevez, Emilio Estevez, Ramon Estevez, Charlie Sheen, Renee Estevez
 Henry Fonda, Jane Fonda, Peter Fonda, Bridget Fonda
 Serge Gainsbourg, Jane Birkin, Charlotte Gainsbourg, Yvan Attal
 Judy Garland, Vincente Minnelli, Liza Minnelli
 Gyllenhaal family- Stephen Gyllenhaal, Maggie Gyllenhaal, Jake Gyllenhaal
 Ethan Hawke, Uma Thurman, Maya Hawke
 Goldie Hawn, Oliver Hudson, Kate Hudson
 Tippi Hedren, Melanie Griffith, Don Johnson, Dakota Johnson
 Rance Howard, Ron Howard, Bryce Dallas Howard
 Walter Huston, John Huston, Anjelica Huston, Danny Huston, Allegra Huston, Tony Huston, Jack Huston
 Jeremy Irons, Sinéad Cusack, Max Irons
 Jackson family- Jackie Jackson, Tito Jackson, Jermaine Jackson, Marlon Jackson, Michael Jackson, Lisa Marie Presley, Rebbie Jackson, Austin Brown, La Toya Jackson, Randy Jackson (The Jacksons), Jermaine Jackson, Janet Jackson
 Kardashian family- Kris Jenner, Kourtney Kardashian, Kim Kardashian, Khloé Kardashian, Kylie Jenner
 Klaus Kinski, Pola Kinski, Nastassja Kinski, Nikolai Kinski
 Lenny Kravitz, Lisa Bonet, Zoë Kravitz
 Lee Hoi-Chuen, Bruce Lee, Brandon Lee, Shannon Lee
 Murdoch family- Rupert Murdoch, Lachlan Murdoch, James Murdoch
 Alfred Newman, Randy Newman, Thomas Newman
 Leo Penn, Eileen Ryan, Michael Penn, Sean Penn
 Redgrave family- Roy Redgrave, Michael Redgrave, Vanessa Redgrave, Natasha Richardson, Joely Richardson
 Debbie Reynolds, Eddie Fisher, Carrie Fisher, Billie Lourd
 Roberto Rosselllini, Ingrid Bergman, Isabella Rossellini
 Jérôme Seydoux, Michel Seydoux, Léa Sedoux
 Stiller and Meara- Jerry Stiller, Anne Meara, Ben Stiller, Amy Stiller
 Donald Sutherland, Kieffer Sutherland, Sara Sutherland
 Jon Voight, Angelina Jolie, James Haven
 Wayans family- Damon Wayans, Kim Wayans, Marlon Wayans, Damon Wayans Jr.
 John Wayne, Patrick Wayne, Ethan Wayne
 Darryl Zanuck, Richard Zanuck, Dean Zanuck

See also 

 List of show business families
 List of Hindi film families
 Film industry
 Entertainment
 Nepotism

References

 Show
Families by profession
Performing arts
 
entertainment